Marin Draganja and Florin Mergea were the defending champions, but Mergea decided not to participate this year. Draganja paired up with Henri Kontinen, but lost in the first round to Martin Kližan and Lukáš Rosol.
Jamie Murray and John Peers won the title, defeating Juan Sebastián Cabal and Robert Farah in the final, 2–6, 6–3, [10–8].

Seeds

Draw

Draw

Qualifying

Seeds

Qualifiers
  Frank Moser /  Jan-Lennard Struff

Qualifying draw

References
 Main Draw
 Qualifying Draw

Doubles